Charlton Hayes is a British mixed-use development located on land north of Filton Airfield and is a new extension to Patchway. Planning permission was granted by the South Gloucestershire Council in 2008 to build 2,200 homes for 6,000 residents. Charlton Hayes was named after the village of Charlton, which was demolished to make way for Filton Airfield extension.

Development 
Charlton Hayes includes 2, 3 and 4 bedroom homes, a car dealership and a new by-pass 'Hayes Way'. Hayes Way links A38 to Merlin Road and Highwood Road at the bottom of The Mall, Cribbs Causeway. The by-pass was designed to relieve congestion on Highwood Road, which is now restricted to buses. The development was funded by Bovis Homes who made a contribution to the Hayes Way construction.

Construction 
Highwood Road controversially closed in October 2012 for a trial period. LED Road signs and threats of police enforcement to remove unauthorized traffic began in 2013. The Royal Mail used the roads from Hayes way to relieve traffic off the Patchway Flyover and Haynes Way will link directly to Gypsy Patch Lane. The old Benson Brothers Sites is converting into a police station for Avon and Somerset Police. It is expected after the full decommissioning of the airfield that more homes will be added to the area. The Vauxhall Dealer at the flyover bought a row of old houses and converted the area into a car park.

Businesses
A Ford dealership operates there. Other construction companies and housing associations are building houses. The confirmed airfield closure could provide new routes linking the old road to Henbury and Southmead.

Unitary Councillors
Charlton Hayes is part of the Charlton and Cribbs ward of South Gloucestershire Council. It is currently represented by three Conservative Councillors:
 Sanjay Shambhu
 Brian Hopkinson
 Jo Buddharaju

Town Councillors
Charlton Hayes is currently part of the Callicroft ward of Patchway Town Council. The Callicroft ward is represented by the following Councillors as of Jul 25, 2021:
 Roger Loveridge, Independent
 Toni Scott, Labour
 Sanjay Shambhu, Conservative
 Brian Hopkinson, Conservative
 Jo Buddharaju, Conservative
 Ken Dando, Conservative
 Patrick Cottrell, Labour
 Sam Scott, Labour
 Dayley Lawrence , Labour

Roads
The main Hayes Way Dual Carriageway is separated into three roundabouts, named after the aeroplanes Concorde, Brabazon, Blenheim. The Highwood Road junction now goes into Wood Street, where many residents live. The Concorde Roundabout loops back to the A38 road back towards the M5 motorway.

References 

South Gloucestershire District
Housing estates in Gloucestershire